David Le Frapper (born 25 March 1971) is a French professional football coach and a former defensive midfielder. He is the head coach of Racing Besançon.

Managerial Career
In May 2022, Le Frapper obtained the Professional Football Coaching Certificate (PFCC), the highest French coaching diploma. Le Frapper was appointed coach of Racing Besançon.

External links
David Le Frapper profile at chamoisfc79.fr
David Le Frapper at Footballdatabase

1971 births
Living people
People from Montargis
Sportspeople from Loiret
French footballers
Footballers from Centre-Val de Loire
Association football midfielders
Chamois Niortais F.C. players
Valenciennes FC players
LB Châteauroux players
US Créteil-Lusitanos players
Stade Lavallois players
FC Gueugnon players
Ligue 1 players
Ligue 2 players
Championnat National players
French football managers
Valenciennes FC managers